Lee Jin-a (born 10 March 1985) is a South Korean former professional tennis player.

In December 2010, she reached a career-high singles ranking of world No. 158. On 28 February 2011, she peaked at No. 197 in the WTA doubles rankings.

Lee started playing tennis at the age of 11.
In her career, she won 11 singles titles and 15 doubles titles on the ITF Women's Circuit.

Playing for South Korea Fed Cup team, Lee has a win–loss record of 11–7.

ITF Circuit finals

Singles: 20 (11 titles, 9 runner-ups)

Doubles: 21 (15 titles, 6 runner-ups)

References

External links
 
 
 

1985 births
Living people
South Korean female tennis players
Tennis players at the 2006 Asian Games
Tennis players at the 2010 Asian Games
Asian Games medalists in tennis
Universiade medalists in tennis
Medalists at the 2010 Asian Games
Asian Games bronze medalists for South Korea
Universiade bronze medalists for South Korea
Medalists at the 2007 Summer Universiade
21st-century South Korean women